Georgiyevskoye is a rural locality (a selo) in Khorinsky District, Republic of Buryatia, Russia. The population was 579 as of 2010. There are 13 streets.

Geography 
Georgiyevskoye is located 55 km northeast of Khorinsk (the district's administrative centre) by road. Amgalanta is the nearest rural locality.

References 

Rural localities in Khorinsky District